Shahzad Elahi (born 1 September 1965) is a Pakistani politician from the Pakistan Muslim League (Q) political party who served as a member of the Provincial Assembly of the Punjab (MPA) from 2002 to 2007 and is an elected member the second time, since 2008 on a non-Muslim minority seat. During his tenure in the provincial assembly, he has functioned as the chairman of the Standing Committee on Housing, Urban Development and Public Health Engineering and is a member of the Finance Committee of the assembly.

A Christian by faith, Elahi resides in Lahore and holds a degree in mechanical engineering from the University of Engineering and Technology. In January 2012, Elahi said during an assembly speech that Punjab was becoming a "living hell" for minorities, pointing out recent incidents of Christian churches being demolished in the province.

References

1965 births
Living people
Punjab MPAs 2002–2007
Pakistani Christians
Pakistan Muslim League (Q) politicians
Politicians from Lahore
Punjabi people
University of Engineering and Technology, Lahore alumni